Robert Tepper (born May 30, 1953) is an American songwriter, recording artist and singer, best known for his hit song "No Easy Way Out" from the Rocky IV motion picture soundtrack. He is also known for co-writing the hit song "Into the Night" with Benny Mardones.

Life and career
Born in Bayonne, New Jersey, Tepper moved to New York where he became a staff writer. He paired up with fellow singer Benny Mardones, and together they wrote Mardones's hit ballad Into the Night, which earned them a Grammy Awards nomination. Tepper worked with Mardones on writing the latter's follow-up album Too Much to Lose in 1981.

In 1985, Tepper signed with Scotti Brothers and moved to Los Angeles. Actor/director Sylvester Stallone was taken with Tepper's song "No Easy Way Out", which subsequently led to its inclusion in the movie Rocky IV and Cobra. "No Easy Way Out" climbed into the Top 40, reaching #22 on Billboard's Hot 100 in 1986, and momentarily putting Tepper in the public eye. Several European labels, including Ministry of Sound, released "No Easy Way Out" with their own dance versions, resulting in regular airplay on German radio stations that continues today (in particular evening dance and party programming in Munich featured on Charivari 95.5 and Radio Gong 96.3). The heavy metal group Bullet For My Valentine also recorded the song in 2008. Tepper released two solo albums for Scotti Bros. Records, but both albums received little promotion from the label. In 1986, one year after Rocky IV, another song from Tepper's debut album (titled No Easy Way Out) called "Angel Of The City" became the insert montage song of Stallone´s film Cobra. Also in 1986, he co-wrote the single "Le Bel Age" for Pat Benatar, which peaked at #54 on the Billboard charts. A second album, Modern Madness was released in 1988. He went on to join the classic hard rock group Iron Butterfly for a few years. His third solo album No Rest For The Wounded Heart was released exclusively in Europe in 1996 on the MTM Music label.

In 2009, Sony/BMG re-released his first two albums digitally.

In recent years, he ventured into writing music for television and film, and collaborated on a musical. In 2012, he released his fourth solo album titled New Life Story. The music is a departure from the big rock sound of the 1980s and has been described as "acoustic, singer/songwriter with an electric tinge."

Tepper's "No Easy Way Out" was featured on a special list of the best songs from '80s action film montages that appeared on music website, No Echo.

Discography

Albums
 No Easy Way Out (Scotti Bros., 1985) Billboard 200 #144
 Modern Madness (Scotti Bros., 1988)
 No Rest for the Wounded Heart (MTM Music, 1996)
 New Life Story (2012)
 Better Than the Rest (AOR Heaven, 2019)
 Feels Like Monday (Heavy Breather, 2022)

Singles

References

External links

Living people
Singer-songwriters from New Jersey
1953 births
Musicians from Bayonne, New Jersey
Iron Butterfly members
Scotti Brothers Records artists
Singer-songwriters from New York (state)